Dayne Kelly and Marinko Matosevic were the defending champions but only Kelly defended his title, partnering Christopher O'Connell. Kelly lost in the first round to Jarmere Jenkins and Anderson Reed.

Matt Reid and John-Patrick Smith won the title after defeating Matthew Barton and Matthew Ebden 6–4, 6–4 in the final.

Seeds

Draw

References
 Main Draw

2016 ATP Challenger Tour
2016 Doubles
2016 in Australian tennis